The East Propylon is the eastern entrance of the Roman Agora in Athens. Built in 19-11 BCE, it consisted of Ionic columns made of gray Hymettian marble.

References

External links
 www.greece-athens.com
 www.360travelguide.com, Virtual tour of the East Propylon.

Landmarks in Athens
Roman Athens